Gwambegwine is a rural locality in the Shire of Banana, Queensland, Australia.

Road infrastructure
The Taroom Bauhinia Downs Road runs through from south-east to north.

References 

Shire of Banana
Localities in Queensland